All Kinds of Weather is an album by jazz pianist Red Garland, recorded in 1958 and released in 1959 on Prestige Records.

Track listing 
"Rain" (Eugene Ford, Brian Alexander Morgan, Arthur Swanstrom) – 4:14
"Summertime" (George Gershwin, Ira Gershwin, DuBose Heyward) – 4:43
"Stormy Weather" (Harold Arlen, Ted Koehler) – 10:35
"Spring Will Be A Little Late This Year" (Frank Loesser) – 5:42
"Winter Wonderland" (Felix Bernard, Dick Smith) – 5:21
"'Tis Autumn" (Henry Nemo) – 9:08

Personnel 
 Red Garland – piano
 Paul Chambers – bass
 Art Taylor – drums

References 

1959 albums
Albums produced by Esmond Edwards
Prestige Records albums
Red Garland albums
Albums recorded at Van Gelder Studio